Dunolly is a town in Victoria, Australia, located on the Dunolly - Maryborough Road, in the Shire of Central Goldfields. At the 2016 census, Dunolly had a population of 893, down from 969 in 2006.

History 
The town began during the Victorian Gold Rush. It is located on the traditional lands of the Dja Dja Wurrung people, who called the area Lea Kuribur.

One of the first accounts of the Dunolly Gold Rush was recorded by the Bendigo Advertiser on 3 July 1857 that estimated the population at 12,000. Confirmation of a rush followed on 10 July.

The exact date that Dunolly was founded is unknown. The location of the township itself moved four times before the 1856 rush, further adding to the confusion of its early history. The modern town is the 5th location, and was founded in July 1856 with the previous resettlements driven by further discoveries of gold leads. Technically, even at this time Dunolly was not a town. It was held as a Municipality from 1858 to 1863, and wasn't officially declared a borough until 1 October 1863.

Goldborough Post Office opened on 1 March 1856 and was renamed Dunolly in 1859.

One of the largest natural gold nuggets ever found, the legendary "Welcome Stranger", was discovered in nearby Moliagul township.

Rail came to Dunolly with the opening of the Mildura railway line in 1875. Another branch line that connected to Inglewood in 1888.

The Dunolly Magistrates' Court closed on 1 August 1981.

Attractions 
Centred on the main street, Broadway, Dunolly features a rural transaction centre, SES, CFA, a pre-school and a primary school, and many businesses. Dunolly is known for its amazing bakery, providing the best sweets in the district. Dunolly hosts a monthly market for vendors from all over Victoria and other states.

Although Dunolly is located on a major rail line, no passenger services are available, but regular bus services offer travel to and from Dunolly.

There is a local museum on Broadway which has a large collection of historic photographs, goldfields implements, replicas of gold nuggets, ladies fashions, needlework, and guns. It also offers a family research facility and regular history tours.

Dunolly has become a favorite location for gold fossicking using metal detectors.
were found near Dunolly. The nuggets have been valued at around $300,000.

The town's Australian Rules football team, the Dunolly Eagles, competes in the Maryborough Castlemaine District Football League. Star recruits, Shannon Motlop and Robbie Ahmat, have played on the team.

Gallery

References

External links

 Dunolly, Victoria  Official website
 Dunolly Historic Precinct

Mining towns in Victoria (Australia)
Towns in Victoria (Australia)